Elachista dimicatella is a moth of the family Elachistidae. It is found in the mountains from Germany and Poland to the Pyrenees, Italy and Romania.

The larvae feed on Alopecurus pratensis, Anthoxanthum odoratum, Calamagrostis arundinacea, Calamagrostis villosa, Dactylis glomerata, Deschampsia cespitosa, Holcus mollis, Milium effusum, Phleum alpinum, Poa alpina, Poa chaixii, Sesleria albicans, Sesleria caerulea, Sesleria sadlerana tatrae. They mine the leaves of their host plant. The mine starts just below the leaf tip. The frass is deposited in parallel strands. Pupation takes place outside of the mine. Larvae can be found from the end June to early July.

References

dimicatella
Moths described in 1903
Moths of Europe
Taxa named by Hans Rebel